The World of Cecil Taylor is an album by Cecil Taylor recorded for the Candid label in October 1960. The album features performances by Taylor with Archie Shepp, Buell Neidlinger and Denis Charles. Alternate takes from these sessions were released on Air in 1987. A 1971 reissue of the original album on the Barnaby label was also titled Air.

Some of the tracks the pianist chose to release on this album were improvised, single-take pieces, while others were the result of multiple takes. The track titled "Air" required 29 takes before being approved by Taylor.

Reception

In a review for AllMusic, Brian Olewnick wrote: "One can only imagine what the reaction of the average jazz fan was in 1960 when this session was recorded. This is a wonderful document from early in Taylor's career, when he was midway between modernist approaches to standard material and his own radical experiments that would come to full fruition a few years hence... What's extra amazing is how deeply entrenched the blues feel and pulse are in this music, already bound for the further reaches of abstraction. They never left Taylor, although many listeners have difficulty discerning them. This session, which has been released under numerous guises, is an especially fine introduction to his work, keeping enough of a foot in 'traditional' jazz forms to offer one purchase while dangling breathtaking visions of the possible within one's reach. A classic recording that belongs in anyone's collection."

Matt Groom, writing for Presto Jazz, commented: "What makes this particular album so fascinating is that we can actually hear the sound of bebop being stretched and ripped apart from inside, as if it's one of the Incredible Hulk's unfortunate t-shirts... The World of... still makes sense as a satisfying jazz album, aided in no small part by Buell Neidlinger's bass which keeps things tethered to a familiar harmonic framework... Taylor famously once said that his approach to the piano was to view it as 'eighty-eight tuned drums', which is exactly what we get here... It’s terrific fun, honest!"

Track listing
All compositions by Cecil Tayor except as indicated
 "Air" [Take 28] - 8:41
 "This Nearly Was Mine" [Take 1] (Oscar Hammerstein II, Richard Rodgers) - 10:51
 "Port of Call" [Take 2] - 4:22
 "E.B." [Take 2] - 9:59
 "Lazy Afternoon" (John Latouche, Jerome Moross) - 14:52

Recorded Nola's Penthouse Sound Studios, NYC, October 12 & 13, 1960

Personnel
Cecil Taylor - piano
Buell Neidlinger - bass
Denis Charles - drums
Archie Shepp - tenor saxophone (tracks 1 & 5)

References

1961 albums
Cecil Taylor albums
Candid Records albums